Teen Vogue is a spin-off of Vogue, published by Condé Nast. It debuted in January 2003.

2002

2003

2004

2005

2006

2007

2008

2009

2010

2011

2012

2013

2014

2015

2016

2017

2018

In March 2018, Teen Vogue, after the shuttering of its print edition, began publishing "digital covers."

2019

2020

2021

2022

Notes

References

Teen Vogue
Magazines published in the United States